Stryker is an unincorporated community and census-designated place (CDP) in Lincoln County, Montana, United States. As of the 2010 census it had a population of 26. Stryker has the 59933 ZIP code.

Named for local homesteaders, Stryker served as a stage station on the Kalispell–Fort Steele (British Columbia) trail. A forest fire swept through the town in 1926. Stryker’s railroad depot closed with the construction of Libby Dam.

It is located just south of a drainage divide separating the Stillwater River, which runs just east of Stryker and flows southeast to the Flathead River, from Summit Creek, which flows northwest and is part of the Tobacco River watershed flowing to the Kootenai River.

Demographics

Images

References

Unincorporated communities in Lincoln County, Montana
Unincorporated communities in Montana
Census-designated places in Lincoln County, Montana
Census-designated places in Montana